"What Do You Take Me For?" is a song by English singer Pixie Lott from her second studio album, Young Foolish Happy (2011). The song features American rapper Pusha T and was released on 4 November 2011 as the album's second single. The track received its first play on Capital FM on 26 September 2011.

Critical reception
Robert Copsey of Digital Spy gave the song four out of five stars, stating: "Fortunately, the rest of the track is less spooktacular and more in-yer-face girl power. 'Don't know what you think I'm after/ What do you take me for?' she calls over a squelchy and thoroughly grindable bassline with just enough disgust in her tone to warn off any fellas who think she's a cheap date. We hate to break it to you Pix, but wearing a snakeskin leotard and popping your crotch on the dancefloor in your accompanying music video will do little to help your cause...you big tease!"

Commercial performance
"What Do You Take Me For?" debuted at number 10 on the UK Singles Chart with first-week sales of 34,335 copies, becoming Lott's first non-number-one single to chart inside the top 10. The following week, it fell to number 20 with 16,553 copies sold.

Music video
The music video, directed by Declan Whitebloom, premiered on 6 October 2011 and develops on a dark background while Lott is seen dancing and singing. It begins with a black and orange Citroen DS3 pulling into a building before Lott and various scantily-clad back-up dancers perform their routine while Pusha T is seemingly pleading to Lott.

Track listing
Digital EP
"What Do You Take Me For?" – 2:55
"What Do You Take Me For?" (Bimbo Jones Remix) – 5:55
"What Do You Take Me For?" (E-Squire Remix) – 5:31
"What Do You Take Me For?" (Benji Boko Remix) – 3:06

Personnel
Credits adapted from the liner notes of Young Foolish Happy.

 Pixie Lott – vocals
 Tim Debney – mastering
 Alex G. – additional engineering, additional vocal production
 Anne Preven – mixing
 Pusha T – rap
 David Ralicke – horns
 Rusko – production

Charts

Release history

References

2011 singles
2011 songs
Mercury Records singles
Pixie Lott songs
Pusha T songs
Songs written by Anne Preven
Songs written by Pixie Lott
Songs written by Pusha T